Pskovsky (masculine), Pskovskaya (feminine), or Pskovskoye (neuter) is the name of several rural localities in Russia:
Pskovskoye, Belgorod Oblast, a selo in Vengerovsky Rural Okrug of Rakityansky District of Belgorod Oblast
Pskovskoye, Krasnoznamensky District, Kaliningrad Oblast, a settlement in Dobrovolsky Rural Okrug of Krasnoznamensky District of Kaliningrad Oblast
Pskovskoye, Gavrilovsky Rural Okrug, Ozyorsky District, Kaliningrad Oblast, two settlements in Gavrilovsky Rural Okrug of Ozyorsky District of Kaliningrad Oblast